The 1998 TranSouth Financial 400 was the fifth stock car race of the 1998 NASCAR Winston Cup Series season and the 42nd iteration of the event. The race was held on Sunday, March 22, 1998, in Darlington, South Carolina, at Darlington Raceway, a  permanent egg-shaped oval racetrack. The race took the scheduled 293 laps to complete. In the late stages of the race, Robert Yates Racing driver Dale Jarrett would manage to defend Hendrick Motorsports driver Jeff Gordon to take his 16th career NASCAR Winston Cup Series victory and his first victory of the season. To fill out the top 3, Gordon and Penske-Kranefuss Racing driver Rusty Wallace would finish second and third, respectively.

Background 

Darlington Raceway is a race track built for NASCAR racing located near Darlington, South Carolina. It is nicknamed "The Lady in Black" and "The Track Too Tough to Tame" by many NASCAR fans and drivers and advertised as "A NASCAR Tradition." It is of a unique, somewhat egg-shaped design, an oval with the ends of very different configurations, a condition which supposedly arose from the proximity of one end of the track to a minnow pond the owner refused to relocate. This situation makes it very challenging for the crews to set up their cars' handling in a way that is effective at both ends.

Entry list 

 (R) denotes rookie driver.

*Changed to 17 after NASCAR did not allow car digits to exceed two digits.

Practice

First practice 
The first practice session was held on the morning of Friday, March 20.

Second practice 
The second practice session was held on the afternoon of Friday, March 20.

Final practice 
The final practice session, sometimes referred to as Happy Hour, was held on Saturday, March 21.

Qualifying 
Qualifying was split into two rounds. The first round was held on Friday, March 20, at 3:30 PM EST. Each driver would have one lap to set a time. During the first round, the top 25 drivers in the round would be guaranteed a starting spot in the race. If a driver was not able to guarantee a spot in the first round, they had the option to scrub their time from the first round and try and run a faster lap time in a second round qualifying run, held on Saturday, March 21, at 11:30 AM EST. As with the first round, each driver would have one lap to set a time. On January 24, 1998, NASCAR would announce that the amount of provisionals given would be increased from last season. Positions 26-36 would be decided on time, while positions 37-43 would be based on provisionals. Six spots are awarded by the use of provisionals based on owner's points. The seventh is awarded to a past champion who has not otherwise qualified for the race. If no past champion needs the provisional, the next team in the owner points will be awarded a provisional.

Six drivers would fail to qualify: Wally Dallenbach Jr., Dave Marcis, Hut Stricklin, Gary Bradberry, Morgan Shepherd, and Ron Hornaday Jr.

Full qualifying results

Race results

References 

1998 NASCAR Winston Cup Series
NASCAR races at Darlington Raceway
March 1998 sports events in the United States
1998 in sports in South Carolina